Maron is a surname. Notable people with the surname include:

Anton von Maron (1733–1808), Austrian painter
Brett Maron (born 1986), American soccer goalkeeper
Hanna Maron (1923–2013), Israeli actress
John Maron (died 707), Syriac monk and saint and the first Maronite Patriarch
Jordan Maron (born 1992), American YouTube personality
Karen Maron (born 1979), Argentine journalist, war correspondent, producer and writer
Karl Maron (1903–1975), Interior minister of East Germany
Marc Maron (born 1963), American stand-up comedian and radio and podcast host
Margaret Maron, American mystery novelist
Maya Maron (born 1980), Israeli actress
Melvin Earl Maron, American computer scientist and professor
Michael Maron, American makeup artist, author, beauty industry entrepreneur, photographer, and media personality
Monika Maron (born 1941), German author
Oliver Maron, Slovak ice hockey player 
Therese Maron (1725–1806), German painter

See also
Maron (disambiguation)
Maroun (disambiguation)